Helichrysum sanguineum, known in English as red everlasting and red cudweed, is a flowering plant of the genus Helichrysum in the family Asteraceae. It grows in mountain forests in the Levant where it blooms in April–June.

Helichrysum sanguineum is a protected plant in  Israel and the Palestinian Authority.

The flower, named in modern Hebrew "blood of the Maccabees", has become the icon of Yom Hazikaron, Memorial Day for Israel's Fallen Soldiers and Victims of Terrorism.

Name

Scientific name
Helichrysum sanguineum (L.) Kostel is not to be mistaken for Helichrysum sanguineum Boiss. = Gnaphalium sanguineum L., which is known in English as sowbread or cyclamen.

Arabic
In Arabic, the flower is known as "دم المسيح" (dam al-Massiah), meaning "blood of the Messiah"/"blood of Christ".

Israel (Modern Hebrew)
In Israel, it is known as "blood of the Maccabees" (dam hamakabim). The  name is derived from a legend saying that in every spot where the flower grows, a drop of blood has spilled on the earth. Since 2019, the non-profit organization Dam HaMaccabim has been distributing pins with the Red Everlasting flower throughout Israel.

Distribution
The plant grows in the Levant, including: western Syria, the Mediterranean coast of Lebanon and Mount Lebanon up to an altitude of 1000 m, on the Golan Heights, in most of the northern and central part of Israel and the West Bank (Upper and Lower Galilee, around the Sea of Galilee, on Mount Carmel and the Coastal Plain south of it, Mount Gilboa, the northern part of the Jordan Valley, Samaria, the Judean mountains and the Shefela), and the mountainous Gilead region in Jordan (the areas of Jarash and Dibeen, Ajloun, and Al-Salt).

See also
Wildlife in Israel
Flora of Lebanon

References

External links

sanguineum
Flora of Lebanon and Syria
Flora of Palestine (region)
Gilead